Zgornje Duplje ( or) is a village in the Municipality of Naklo in the Upper Carniola region of Slovenia.

Church

The local church is dedicated to Archangel Michael.

References

External links

Zgornje Duplje on Geopedia

Populated places in the Municipality of Naklo